The 1987 Paine Webber Classic was a men's tennis tournament played on outdoor hard courts at the Grand Cypress Resort in Orlando, Florida in the United States that was part of the 1987 Nabisco Grand Prix. It was the third edition of the tournament and was held from March 16 through March 22, 1987. Unseeded Christo van Rensburg won the singles title and earned $50,000 first-prize money.

Finals

Singles
 Christo van Rensburg defeated  Jimmy Connors 6–3, 3–6, 6–1
 It was van Rensburg's only singles title of the year and the first of his career.

Doubles
 Sherwood Stewart /  Kim Warwick defeated  Paul Annacone /  Christo van Rensburg 2–6, 7–6, 6–4
 It was Stewart's only doubles title of the year and the 53rd and last of his career. It was Warwick's only doubles title of the year and the 26th and last of his career.

References

External links
 ITF tournament edition details

Paine Webber Classic
Verizon Tennis Challenge
Paine Webber Classic